The Italian Armed Forces encompass the Italian Army, the Italian Navy and the Italian Air Force. A fourth branch of the armed forces, known as the Carabinieri, take on the role as the nation's military police and are also involved in missions and operations abroad as a combat force. Despite not being a branch of the armed forces, the Guardia di Finanza has military status and is organized along military lines. These five forces comprise a total of 340,885 men and women with the official status of active military personnel, of which 167,057 are in the Army, Navy and Air Force. The President of the Italian Republic heads the armed forces as the President of the High Council of Defence established by article 87 of the Constitution of Italy. According to article 78, the Parliament has the authority to declare a state of war and vest the powers to lead the war in the Government.

Organization
The office of the Chief of Defence is organised as follows:

The four branches of Italian Armed Forces

Esercito Italiano

The ground force of Italy, the Regio Esercito dates back to the unification of Italy in the 1850s and 1860s. It fought in colonial engagements in China during the Boxer Rebellion, against the Ottoman Empire in Libya (1911-1912), on the Alps against the Austro-Hungarian Empire during World War I, in Abyssinia during the Interwar period, and in World War II in Albania, Greece, North Africa and Russia, as well as in the Italian Civil War. During the Cold War the Army prepared itself to defend against a Warsaw Pact invasion from the east. Since the dissolution of the Soviet Union, it has seen extensive peacekeeping service in Lebanon, Afghanistan, and Iraq. On 29 July 2004 it became a professional all-volunteer force when conscription was finally ended.

Marina Militare

The navy of Italy was created in 1861, following the proclamation of the Kingdom of Italy, as the Regia Marina. The new navy's baptism of fire came during the Third Italian War of Independence against the Austrian Empire. During the First World War, it spent its major efforts in the Adriatic Sea, fighting the Austro-Hungarian Navy. In the Second World War, it engaged the Royal Navy in a two-and-a-half-year struggle for the control of the Mediterranean Sea. After the war, the new Marina Militare, being a member of the North Atlantic Treaty Organisation (NATO), has taken part in many coalition peacekeeping operations. It is a blue-water navy. The Guardia Costiera (Coast Guard) is a component of the navy.

Aeronautica Militare

The air force of Italy was founded as an independent service arm on 28 March 1923, by King Vittorio Emanuele III as the Regia Aeronautica (which equates to "Royal Air Force"). During the 1930s, it was involved in its first military operations in Ethiopia in 1935, and later in the Spanish Civil War between 1936 and 1939. Eventually, Italy entered World War II alongside Germany. After the armistice of 8 September 1943, Italy was divided into two sides, and the same fate befell the Regia Aeronautica. The Air Force was split into the Italian Co-Belligerent Air Force in the south aligned with the Allies, and the pro-Axis Aeronautica Nazionale Repubblicana in the north until the end of the war. When Italy was made a republic by referendum, the air force was given its current name Aeronautica Militare.

Carabinieri

The Arma dei Carabinieri is the gendarmerie and military police of Italy. The corps was instituted in 1814 by King Victor Emmanuel I of Savoy with the aim of providing the Kingdom of Sardinia with a police corps; it is therefore older than Italy itself. The new force was divided into divisions on the scale of one division for each province of Italy. The divisions were further divided into companies and subdivided into lieutenancies, which commanded and coordinated the local police stations and were distributed throughout the national territory in direct contact with the public. The Italian unification saw the number of divisions increased, and in 1861 the Carabinieri were appointed the "First Force" of the new national military organization. In recent years Carabinieri became the fourth branch of Italian Armed Forces. Primarily they carry out law enforcement, military policing duties and peacekeeping mission abroad, such as Kosovo, Afghanistan, and Iraq. At the Sea Islands Conference of the G8 in 2004, the Carabinieri were given the mandate to establish a Center of Excellence for Stability Police Units (CoESPU) to spearhead the development of training and doctrinal standards for civilian police units attached to international peacekeeping missions.

International stance

Italy has joined in many UN, NATO and EU operations as well as with assistance to Russia and the other CIS nations, Middle East peace process, peacekeeping, and combating the illegal drug trade, human trafficking, piracy and terrorism.

Italy did take part in the 1982 Multinational Force in Lebanon along with US, French and British troops. Italy also participated in the 1990–91 Gulf War, with the deployment of eight Panavia Tornado IDS bomber jets; Italian Army troops were subsequently deployed to assist Kurdish refugees in northern Iraq following the conflict.

As part of Operation Enduring Freedom, Italy contributed to the international operation in Afghanistan. Italian forces have contributed to ISAF, the NATO force in Afghanistan, and to the Provincial reconstruction team. Italy has sent 3,800 troops, including one infantry company from the 2nd Alpini Regiment tasked to protect the ISAF HQ, one engineer company, one NBC platoon, one logistic unit, as well as liaison and staff elements integrated into the operation chain of command. Italian forces also command a multinational engineer task force and have deployed a platoon of Carabinieri military police.

The Italian Army did not take part in combat operations of the 2003 Iraq War, dispatching troops only when major combat operations were declared over by the U.S. President George W. Bush. Subsequently, Italian troops arrived in the late summer of 2003, and began patrolling Nasiriyah and the surrounding area. Italian participation in the military operations in Iraq was concluded by the end of 2006, with full withdrawal of Italian military personnel except for a small group of about 30 soldiers engaged in providing security for the Italian embassy in Baghdad. Italy played a major role in the 2004-2011 NATO Training Mission to assist in the development of Iraqi security forces training structures and institutions.

Operations

Since the second post-war the Italian armed force has become more and more engaged in international peace support operations, mainly under the auspices of the United Nations. The Italian armed forces are currently participating in 26 missions.

UNMOGIP, since 1951 (India and Pakistan)
UNTSO, since 1958 (Israel, Egypt, Syria and Lebanon)
UNIFIL, since 1978 (Lebanon)
MINURSO, since 1991 (Western Sahara)
UNFICYP, since 2005 (Cyprus)
MINUSMA, since 2013 (Mali)

EUFOR Althea, since 2004 (Bosnia and Herzegovina)
EUBAM Rafah, since 2005 (Gaza–Egypt border)
EUPOL Afghanistan, since 2007 (Afghanistan)
EUNAVFOR Atalanta, since 2008 (Gulf of Aden)
EUMM Georgia, since 2008 (Georgia, South Ossetia and Abkhazia)
EULEX Kosovo, since 2008 (Kosovo)
EUTM Somalia, since 2010 (Somalia)
EUCAP Nestor, since 2012 (Indian Ocean)
EUCAP Sahel Niger, since 2012 (Niger)
EUBAM Libya, since 2013 (Libya)
EUTM Mali, since 2013 (Mali)
EUFOR RCA, since 2014 (Central African Republic)

KFOR, since 1999 (Kosovo)
ISAF, 2001-2021 (Afghanistan)
Operation Active Endeavour, since 2001 (Mediterranean Sea)
Operation Ocean Shield, since 2009 (Gulf of Aden)
Multilateral missions
TIPH-2, since 1997 (West Bank)
Operation Cyrene, since 2011 (Libya)
MIADIT Somalia, since 2013 (Somalia and Djibouti)
MIADIT Palestine, since 2014 (West Bank)

Gallery

See also
 List of Italian service weapons
 National Institute for the Honour Guard of the Royal Tombs of the Pantheon
Uniforms of the Italian Armed Forces
List of military equipment of Italy

Citations

References

External links

 Official Site of Italian Ministry of Defense 
 Official Site of Italian Army 
 Official Site of Italian Navy 
 Official Site of Italian Air Force 
 Official Site of Carabinieri 
 Official Site of Guardia di Finanza 

 
 

 
1861 establishments in Italy
Permanent Structured Cooperation